Dan Tichon (born 5 January 1937) is a former Israeli politician who served as the Speaker of the Knesset between 1996 and 1999.

Biography
Dan Tichon was born in Kiryat Haim during the Mandate era. He  served as an officer in the Israel Defense Forces before graduating with an economics and international relations degree from the Hebrew University of Jerusalem. From 1970 to 1974, he served as Advisor to the Minister of Trade and Industry on Development Areas and from 1971 to 1981, he was Chairman of the Directors' Council of the Housing and Development Company. In 1977, he was appointed Director General of the Housing and Development Company. In the 2000s (decade), he served as the Chairman of the Israel Port Authority and later as the Chairman of the Israel Ports Development & Assets Company, but resigned in January 2006 over corruption issues.

Political career
In 1981, he was elected to the 10th Knesset as a member of Likud. He served as member of the Knesset Committees on Finance, Internal Affairs and the Environment, State Control, Energy, and Sport. In 1984, Tichon was re-elected and became Deputy Speaker of the Knesset and member of the Knesset Committees on Finance and State Audit.

After being elected again to the 12th Knesset he continued in these positions, serving also as Chairman of the Israel-Germany Parliamentary Friendship League.

In the 13th Knesset he was Chairman of the Knesset Committee on State Audit, and member of the Knesset Committee on Finance. In July 1996, he was appointed Speaker of the 14th Knesset.

He lost his seat in the 1999 elections.

In 2010–2011, Tichon was chairman of the Task Force for International Cooperation on Holocaust Education, Remembrance, and Research (ITF).

Personal life
Tichon is married and has two children. His grandson, Roy Schwartz Tichon is an activist promoting civil rights through “Noa Tanua”, a nonprofit organization he founded.

References

External links

1937 births
Living people
Deputy Speakers of the Knesset
Hebrew University of Jerusalem Faculty of Social Sciences alumni
Israeli economists
Likud politicians
Members of the 10th Knesset (1981–1984)
Members of the 11th Knesset (1984–1988)
Members of the 12th Knesset (1988–1992)
Members of the 13th Knesset (1992–1996)
Members of the 14th Knesset (1996–1999)
People from Haifa
Speakers of the Knesset